The Zirkelstein is the smallest table hill of Saxon Switzerland, in Germany. It is a wooded, cone-shaped hill with a striking  summit block of sandstone rock.

Location and area 
The Zirkelstein is located five kilometres southeast of Bad Schandau in the part of Saxon Switzerland that lies left of the River Elbe. Immediately northwest of the hill is the village of Schöna in the municipality of Reinhardtsdorf-Schöna, whilst east of the hill – in the Elbe valley – is the municipality of Hřensko (Herrnskretschen), over the border in the Czech Republic. Immediately at the foot of the Zirkelstein is a former Friends of Nature house with a restaurant and a small bungalow village. The land of the Zirkelstein has been in private hands since 2008.

History 

In 1841 the then owner of the hill, Johann Gottlob Füssel, built a small inn on the side of the Zirkelstein. In 1842 facilities were built to enable the summit to be made accessible to visitors. The inn was run by the family until 1913 and then the business was leased. On 3 September 1926 the inn was set on fire by lightning during a heavy thunderstorm and was razed to the ground.

Currently the hill, which has an area of 7 hectares, is owned by the ZirkelsteinResort gGmbH. The best-known painting of the Zirkelsteins is by Caspar David Friedrich. In the background of his 1818 painting, Der Wanderer über dem Nebelmeer, the hill appears in the background.

Name 
The Zirkelstein gets its name from its characteristic shape that, from a distance, resembles a compass (German: Zirkel). In 1592 the hill was first mentioned, as the Circkelstein.

Ascent 
The Zirkelstein is best approached from Schöna along at yellow signed hiking trail. The summit itself may be gained using the metal steps and railings provided.

Views 
Due to its isolated situation the summit offers a comprehensive all-round view over the forests and crags of Saxon and Bohemian Switzerland and the Lusatian Mountains.

Gallery

References

External links 

 The Friends of Nature facility on the Zirkelstein

Rock formations of Saxon Switzerland
Mountains of Saxon Switzerland
Elbe Sandstone Mountains
Hills of Saxony